The following is the guest list for the wedding of Prince Harry and Meghan Markle, which took place on 19 May 2018, at St George's Chapel, Windsor Castle.

Relatives of the groom

The House of Windsor
 The Queen and The Duke of Edinburgh, the groom's paternal grandparents 
 The Prince of Wales, and The Duchess of Cornwall the groom's father and stepmother 
 The Duke and Duchess of Cambridge, the groom's brother and sister-in-law
 Prince George of Cambridge, the groom's nephew
 Princess Charlotte of Cambridge, the groom's niece
 The Princess Royal and Vice Admiral Sir Timothy Laurence, the groom's paternal aunt and uncle
 Peter and Autumn Phillips, the groom's first cousin and his wife
 Zara and Michael Tindall, the groom's first cousin and her husband
 The Duke and Duchess of York, the groom's paternal uncle (godfather) and his ex-wife
 Princess Beatrice of York, the groom's first cousin
 Princess Eugenie of York and Jack Brooksbank, the groom's first cousin and her fiancé
 The Earl and Countess of Wessex, the groom's paternal uncle and aunt
 Lady Louise Mountbatten-Windsor, the groom's first cousin
 Viscount Severn, the groom's first cousin
 The Princess Margaret, Countess of Snowdon's family:
 The Earl and Countess of Snowdon, the groom's first cousin, once removed and his wife
 Viscount Linley, the groom's second cousin
 Lady Margarita Armstrong-Jones, the groom's second cousin
 Lady Sarah and Daniel Chatto, the groom's first cousin, once removed and godmother and her husband
 Samuel Chatto, the groom's second cousin
 Arthur Chatto, the groom's second cousin
Other descendants of the Prince's great-great-grandfather King George V and their families:
The Duke and Duchess of Gloucester, the groom's first cousin, twice removed and his wife
The Duke and Duchess of Kent, the groom's first cousin, twice removed and his wife
Princess Alexandra, The Honourable Lady Ogilvy, the groom's first cousin, twice removed
Prince and Princess Michael of Kent, the groom's first cousin, twice removed and his wife

The Spencer family
 Lady Sarah and Neil McCorquodale, the groom's maternal aunt and uncle
 Emily McCorquodale, the groom's first cousin
 George McCorquodale, the groom's first cousin
 Celia McCorquodale, the groom's first cousin
 The Lady and Lord Fellowes, the groom's maternal aunt and uncle
 The Honourable Laura Pettman, the groom's first cousin
 The Honourable Alexander Fellowes, the groom's first cousin
 The Honourable Eleanor Fellowes, the groom's first cousin
 The Earl and Countess Spencer, the groom's maternal uncle and aunt
 Lady Kitty Spencer, the groom's first cousin
 Lady Eliza Spencer, the groom's first cousin
 Viscount Althorp, the groom's first cousin

The Bowes-Lyon family
 Lady Elizabeth Shakerley, the groom's second cousin, once removed

The Mountbatten family
 Lady Alexandra and Thomas Hooper, the groom's third cousin and her husband

The Parker Bowles family
Tom and Sara Parker Bowles, the groom's stepbrother and his wife 
Laura and Harry Lopes, the groom's stepsister and her husband
Ben and Mary-Clare Elliot, the groom's stepcousin and his wife

The Middleton family
 Michael and Carole Middleton, parents of the groom's sister-in-law, The Duchess of Cambridge
 Pippa and James Matthews, sister and brother-in-law of The Duchess of Cambridge
 James William Middleton, brother of The Duchess of Cambridge

Relatives of the bride
 Doria Ragland, the bride's mother

Foreign royalty

Members of reigning royal families
  Prince Seeiso and Princess Mabereng Seeiso of Lesotho (brother of the King of Lesotho. Both the groom and Prince Seeiso are the founders of the Lesotho-based AIDS charity Sentebale)

Members of non-reigning royal families
 The Hereditary Prince and Princess of Oettingen-Spielberg

Politicians
  Sir John Major and his wife, Dame Norma Major
  Sir Nicholas Soames (grandson of Winston Churchill)

Religious figures
 Anba Angaelos, Coptic Orthodox Archbishop of London (offered prayers)
 David Conner, Dean of Windsor
 Michael Curry, Presiding Bishop and Primate of The Episcopal Church (delivered the sermon during the ceremony)
 Rose Hudson-Wilkin, Honorary Chaplain to the Queen (offered prayers)
 Justin Welby, Archbishop of Canterbury

Friends of Prince Harry and Meghan Markle
 Victoria Aitken (former wife of the groom's uncle, the Earl Spencer)
 Markus Anderson (long-time friend of the bride)
 Alessandra Balazs (friend of the couple; introduced to the groom via Arthur Landon)
 Carolyn Bartholomew (godmother of the groom and friend of his mother the late Princess of Wales) and her husband, William Bartholomew.
 Cressida Bonas (granddaughter of Edward Curzon, 6th Earl Howe, friend and ex-girlfriend of the groom)
 Emilie van Cutsem (widow of the grooms father's friend, Hugh van Cutsem)
 Major Nicholas (childhood friend of the groom) and Alice van Cutsem (parents of bridesmaid Florence van Cutsem)
 Adrian and Sophie Dandridge (community workers at Botswana's Great Plains Conservation where the couple had their 3rd date)
 Chelsy Davy (friend and ex-girlfriend of the groom) and her brother Shaun Davy
 Rebecca Deacon (former private secretary to the Duchess of Cambridge) and Adam Priestley
 Heather Dorak (college friend of the bride and pilates instructor) and her husband, Matt Cohen
 Mark Dyer (former equerry to the Prince of Wales) and wife, Amanda Dyer (parents of page boy Jasper Dyer)
Misan Harriman (photographer and long-time friend of the bride) and wife Camilla Holmstroem
 Patrick "Paddy" Harverson (former communications secretary to the Prince of Wales and Duchess of Cornwall, official spokesman to the Duke and Duchess of Cambridge) and wife, Mel Harverson
 Michael Hess (friend of the groom)
 Ben Murray (cousin of the groom)
 Genevieve Hillis (long-time friend of the bride)
 Tom Inskip (friend of the groom from Eton College; son of Owen Inskip, a friend of the groom's father) and wife, The Honourable Lara Inskip (daughter of Lord St Helens)
 Daisy Jenks (friend of the groom)
 Lindsay Jordan, née Roth (long-time friend of the bride) and her husband, Gavin Jordan
 Celine Khavarani (long-time friend of the bride)
 Brian Kocinski (long-time friend of the bride)
 Arthur Landon (long-time friend of the groom)
 Katalin Landon (friend of the groom)
 Ed Lane Fox (former private secretary of the groom) and wife, Sonia Lane Fox
 The Honourable Dame Shân Legge-Bourke (mother of the groom's former nanny, Tiggy Pettifer)
 Zara Gordon-Lennox, née Legge-Bourke (younger daughter of Shân Legge-Bourke) and Angus Gordon-Lennox
 Silver Tree (long-time friend of the bride) and her husband, Abraham Levy
 Benita Litt  (college friend of the bride) and husband Darren Litt (parents of bridesmaids Rylan and Remi Litt)
 Alexi Lubomirski (the couple's official engagement photographer) and his wife, Giada Lubomirski
 Isabel May (close friend of the bride)
 James Meade (friend of the groom; son of Richard Meade) and his wife, Lady Laura Marsham (daughter of the Earl of Romney)
 Lucy Meadmore (long-time friend of the bride)
 Guy Pelly (friend of the groom) and wife, Lizzie Wilson (heiress to the Holiday Inn empire)
 Tiggy Pettifer (the groom's former nanny, formerly known as Tiggy Legge-Bourke) and her husband, Charles Pettifer (former Guards officer)
 Their sons Fred (the groom's godson) and Tom Pettifer
 Julia Samuel (friend of the late Princess of Wales) and her husband, the Honourable Michael Samuel (son of the 4th Viscount Bearsted)
 Dean Stott and Alana Stott (friends of the groom; Dean and Prince Harry met whilst training together for 10-weeks for Afghanistan)
 Alexander and Claire van Straubenzee (family friends of the groom)
 Charlie van Straubenzee (friend of the groom)
 Thomas van Straubenzee (friend of the groom)
 The Lord Vestey (Master of the Horse to the Royal Household)
 The Honourable William Vestey and his wife, Violet Henderson (contributing editor to British Vogue)
 Nicholas Walton Collins (friend of the bride and former talent agent) his partner, Amelia Walton Collins
 Amanda Ward (widow of Gerald Ward, the groom's godfather)
 Lady Carolyn (horse racing manager; daughter of the 7th Earl of Carnarvon) and John Warren (the Queen's current horse racing adviser)
 Jake (childhood friend of the groom) and Zoe Warren (parents of bridesmaid Zalie Warren)
 Jessie Webb (former nanny of the groom)
 Violet Von Westenholz
 The Duchess of Westminster (the groom's family friend)
 Lady Edwina Grosvenor and Daniel Snow (historian/television presenter)
 The Duke of Westminster
 Lady Viola Grosvenor

Famous friends and notable guests 
 Patrick J. Adams (Suits co-star and friend of the bride) and wife, Troian Bellisario (American actress)
 David Beckham (English former professional football player and friend of the groom) and wife Victoria Beckham (English singer and fashion designer)
 James Blunt (British singer-songwriter and friend of the groom) and wife, Sofia Wellesley (granddaughter of the 8th Duke of Wellington)
 Priyanka Chopra (Indian actress, model and friend of the bride)
 George Clooney (American actor) and wife, Amal Clooney (friends of the couple)
 James Corden (British talk show host and friend of the groom) and wife, Julia Carey (TV producer)
 Idris Elba (British actor and friend of the groom) and fiancée, Sabrina Dhowre
 Nacho Figueras (professional polo player and friend of the groom) and wife, Delfina Blaquier
 Janina Gavankar (American actress and friend of the bride)
 Will Greenwood (former professional rugby player and friend of the groom) and wife, Caroline Greenwood
 Tom Hardy (British actor and friend of the groom) and wife, Charlotte Riley
 James Haskell (former professional rugby player and friend of the groom) and fiancée, Chloe Madeley (British television presenter) 
 Rick Hoffman (Suits co-star and friend of the bride)
 Elton John (family friend of the groom) and husband, David Furnish
 Gabriel Macht (Suits co-star and friend of the bride) and wife, Jacinda Barrett
 Carey Mulligan (British actress and friend of the bride) and husband (singer-songwriter and friend of the groom) Marcus Mumford
 Jessica and Ben Mulroney (long-time friends of bride; son and daughter-in-law of former Canadian Prime Minister Brian Mulroney); and parents of page boys Brian and John Mulroney as well as bridesmaid Ivy Mulroney)
 Misha Nonoo (fashion designer and long-time friend of the bride)
 Sarah Rafferty (Suits co-star and friend of the bride) and husband, Aleksanteri Olli-Pekka Seppälä
 Jill Smoller (American sports talent agent and friend of the bride)
 Abigail Spencer (long-time friend of the bride and later Suits co-star) Joss Stone (British singer-songwriter and friend of the groom)
 Gina Torres (Suits co-star and friend of the bride)
 Jonny Wilkinson (former professional rugby player and friend of the groom) and wife, Shelley Jenkins
Serena Williams (professional tennis player and long-time friend of the bride) and husband, Alexis Ohanian (founder of Reddit) 
Oprah Winfrey (American talk-show host)
Clive Woodward (former professional rugby player and friend of the groom) and wife Lady Woodward

Wedding attendants
Best man
 Charlie Van Straubenzee -childhood friend of groom

Flower girls and page boys
Flower girls
 Princess Charlotte of Cambridge (aged 3), niece of the groom Rylan Litt (aged 7), goddaughter of the bride Remi Litt (aged 6), goddaughter of the bride Ivy Mulroney (aged 4), goddaughter of the bride Florence van Cutsem (aged 3), goddaughter of the groom Zalie Warren, (aged 2), goddaughter of the groomPage boys
 Prince George of Cambridge (aged 4), nephew of the groom Brian Mulroney (aged 7), son of the bride's close friend John Mulroney (aged 7), son of the bride's close friend 
 Jasper Dyer (aged 6), godson of the groom''

Charities and Members of the Public invited to the Wedding 
Along with friends, family and relations of the bride and groom, the couple invited 2,000 members of the public to the grounds of the Windsor wedding. This included 500 members of the Royal Household, 1,200 inspiring citizens and young people (chosen by Lord Lieutenants up and down the country), 200 guests from charity organisations the couple have a close association with and 100 local school children.

Charity organisations 
Well Child
Sentebale
One Young World
Myna Mahlia Foundation
Invictus Games Foundation

Regions of Invitees of the Lord Lieutenants and the couple 

 Northern Ireland 
 West Midlands
 East Midlands and East England
 South West
 South East
 North East and Yorkshire
 North West
 Scotland
 Wales

See also
 List of wedding guests of Charles, Prince of Wales, and Lady Diana Spencer (1981)
 List of wedding guests of Prince William and Catherine Middleton (2011)
 List of wedding guests of Princess Eugenie and Jack Brooksbank (2018)

References

British royal weddings
Wedding guests
Wedding guests
2018 in England
Wedding ceremony participants